The Naval Supply Systems Command (NAVSUP) is the United States Navy's supply command, providing the Navy and United States Marine Corps with supplies, services, and quality-of-life support.

Headquartered in Mechanicsburg, Pennsylvania, the NAVSUP/Navy Supply Corps team oversees a diverse portfolio including supply chain management for material support to the Navy and Marine Corps, supply operations, conventional ordnance, contracting, resale, fuel, transportation, security assistance, and quality of life issues for naval forces, including food service, postal services, Navy Exchanges, and movement of household goods. 

The current Commander is Rear Admiral Peter G. Stamatopoulos, who assumed this post in 2020.

Activities 
In addition to its headquarters activity, NAVSUP comprises four major organizations with 11 commands located worldwide.

NAVSUP Headquarters 

Fleet Logistics: Establishes policy and provides direction for the Navy's quality of life program
 Corporate Operations: Directs operations in the areas of talent management and administration, strategy, innovation, data analysis, process improvement, communications, security, safety, facilities, small business programs, and execution of the Department of Navy Card Management Program
 Enterprise Logistics Engineering: Provides information management/information technology certification and budgeting; Enterprise supply chain and customer systems support; Enterprise business systems solutions; and Navy information technology policy, guidance and leadership
 Contracting: Provides framework for the delivery of contracting services across the Navy Field Contracting System.
 Financial Management and Comptroller: Financial planning, programming, budgeting, accounting, control and execution of resources and funds within NAVSUP
 Reserve Affairs: Provides guidance to NAVSUP activities regarding Navy Reserve manpower requirements determination, training, and Navy Reserve personnel utilization.
 Office of General Counsel Serves as the Command Counsel, principal attorney and legal advisor to the Commander, and the Vice Commander, NAVSUP.
 NAVSUP Office of Corporate Communications: Oversees strategic communication efforts across the NAVSUP Enterprise.

Organizations 
NAVSUP Weapon Systems Support (NAVSUP WSS)
Provides Navy, Marine Corps, Joint and Allied Forces program and supply support for Naval weapon systems. Naval Material Supply Chain Management delivers supply support and program support in order to provide the Navy with the parts they need, when and where they need them. Naval Material SCM is provided by NAVSUP WSS at its two Pennsylvania locations. NAVSUP WSS Philadelphia provides support for Naval aviation weapons systems while the Mechanicsburg site supports ships, submarines and nuclear propulsion.
NAVSUP Business Systems Center (NAVSUP BSC)
Technology developer that designs, develops, and maintains information systems that support activities in logistics, supply chain management, transportation, finance and accounting.
Navy Exchange Service Command
Provides customers with goods and services and supports Navy quality of life programs for active duty military, retirees, reservists and their families. NEXCOM oversees six primary business programs: Navy Exchange (NEX) Retail Stores and Services; Navy Lodge Program; Uniform Program Management Office (UPMO); Navy Clothing and Textile Research Facility (NCTRF); Ships Store Program; and Telecommunications Program Office.
NAVSUP Fleet Logistics Centers
The eight NAVSUP FLCs are located around the world to allow NAVSUP to provide the supplies, services, and support needed by Navy and Marine Corps personnel.
NAVSUP Fleet Logistics Center Bahrain, located in Manama, serves United States Naval Forces Central Command (CENTCOM) and the United States Fifth Fleet.
NAVSUP Fleet Logistics Center Jacksonville serves Naval activities throughout the Navy Region Southeast, from Texas to Cuba.

NAVSUP Fleet Logistics Center Norfolk serves Naval activities throughout the Navy Region Mid-Atlantic.
NAVSUP Fleet Logistics Center Pearl Harbor serves Naval activities throughout the Indo-Pacific.

NAVSUP Fleet Logistics Center Puget Sound, located at Naval Base Kitsap, serves Naval activities throughout the Pacific Rim.

NAVSUP Fleet Logistics Center San Diego serves Naval activities throughout the Navy Region Southwest.

NAVSUP Fleet Logistics Center Sigonella serves Naval activities throughout Europe, Africa, and the operations area of the United States Sixth Fleet.

NAVSUP Fleet Logistics Center Yokosuka serves Naval activities throughout the Western Pacific.

See also
U.S. Armed Forces systems commands
 Army Materiel Command
 Marine Corps Systems Command
 United States Navy systems commands
 Naval Sea Systems Command
 Naval Air Systems Command
 Naval Information Warfare Systems Command
 Naval Facilities Engineering Systems Command
 Air Force Materiel Command
 Space Systems Command

References

External links
 Naval Supply Systems Command official website

Shore commands of the United States Navy
Year of establishment missing
Cumberland County, Pennsylvania
Military units and formations in Pennsylvania
Organizations based in Pennsylvania